This list of museums in Missouri encompasses museums which are defined for this context as institutions (including non-profit organizations, government entities, and private businesses) that collect and care for objects of cultural, artistic, scientific, or historical interest and make their collections or related exhibits available for public viewing. Museums that exist only in cyberspace (i.e., virtual museums) are not included. Also included are non-profit and university art galleries.

Museums

See also 
 Nature Centers in Missouri

Defunct museums 
 '57 Heaven, Branson, formerly part of Dick Clark's American Bandstand Theater
 American Presidents Museum, Branson, collections now part of the National Center for Presidential Studies
 Augusta Station, Augusta, exhibit of model railroads
 Cementland, St. Louis, outdoor sculpture park, future uncertain since death of creator in 2011
 Civilian Conservation Corps Museum, St. Louis, closed in 2008
 Clarksville Museum, Clarksville
 Columbia Audubon Society Trailside Museum, Columbia
 Fire Museum of Missouri, Willow Springs
 First Due Museum, Hazelwood
 Fred Bear Museum, Springfield, now incorporated into the Archery Hall of Fame
 General Sweeny's Museum of Civil War History, Republic, closed in 2005
 International Bowling Museum, St. Louis, moved to Arlington, Texas in 2010
 Memoryville USA, Rolla, closed in 2009
 Missouri Photojournalism Hall of Fame, Washington, closed in 2014 and seeking new location, website
 National Video Game and Coin-Op Museum, St. Louis, closed in 1999
 Nance Museum, Lone Jack, collection of Saudi Arabian art and artifacts, donated to the University of Central Missouri, Warrensburg, Missouri in 2003
 Ozarks Afro-American Heritage Museum, Ash Grove, closed in 2013, collection now online
 Roy Rogers - Dale Evans Museum, Branson, website, moved from Victorville, California then closed in 2009
 Society of Memories Doll Museum, Saint Joseph, closed in 2011, collection now part of the St. Joseph Museums
 Walnut Springs Farm & Museum, Marshfield
 YouZeum, Columbia, closed 2010

References

External links
Visit Missouri

Missouri
 
Museums
Museums